Lautaro Fausto Grillo (born 20 February 1993) is an Argentine professional footballer who plays as a central defender for Spanish club UD Ibiza.

Club career
On 26 November 2019, he signed a contract with Italian Serie B club Trapani until the end of the 2019–20 season.

References

External links
Profile at Vélez Sarsfield's official website 

1993 births
Living people
Argentine footballers
Argentine expatriate footballers
Association football defenders
Club Atlético Vélez Sarsfield footballers
Göztepe S.K. footballers
Trapani Calcio players
O'Higgins F.C. footballers
UD Ibiza players
Argentine Primera División players
Chilean Primera División players
Serie B players
Expatriate footballers in Chile
Expatriate footballers in Greece
Argentine expatriate sportspeople in Turkey
Expatriate footballers in Turkey
Expatriate footballers in Italy
Sportspeople from Bariloche
Expatriate footballers in Spain
Argentine expatriate sportspeople in Spain